Henchir-Loulou a locality and archaeology site near the modern town of Aïn Makhlouf, Algeria. It is the site of an ancient Roman Era town.

Known throughout antiquity as Rotaria, Henchir-Loulou is a site containing vast archeological remains but, unfortunately, the site has experienced a significant loss in its archaeological fabric as it has been used as a quarry for cut stone, for nearby villages. this has led to a degradation in the original makeup of the town. 

The first comprehensive survey of the Roman town was conducted by Léon Renier during French colonial times.

References

Roman towns and cities in Algeria